A Foot in the Grave is a 1987 novel by Scottish writer Bruce Marshall.

Plot summary
When John Smith's garrulous South American wife was found dead in Buenos Aires, he is accused by the Argentine police not only of her murder, but also of tax evasion, links with the British Intelligence Service and of conspiring to overthrow the Argentine dictatorship.

References

Novels by Bruce Marshall
1987 British novels
Novels set in Buenos Aires
Robert Hale books